AggieCon is the oldest and largest student-run multigenre convention in the United States. Held annually since 1969 by Cepheid Variable at Texas A&M University's Memorial Student Center, it has grown to become one of the larger conventions in Texas. AggieCon was the first science fiction convention ever sponsored by a college or a college affiliate student organization.

The convention is known for its relaxed atmosphere, where guests and attendees can sit and chat on the couches outside the dealers' room and art show. The scope of AggieCon ranges from science fiction to fantasy to horror, and encompasses literature, graphic arts, and general media. Activities and events include panel discussions, costume contest, the Rocky Horror Picture Show, dealer's room, art show, and much gaming, including LARPing.

Some former Cepheid Variable members have gone on to become science fiction/fantasy writers, including Martha Wells, Jayme Blaschke, and Steven Gould.

Cepheid Variable was named the 2006 Registered Student Organization of the Year at Texas A&M. Among the cited reasons for the award were the $1,500 they donate each year to Scotty's House Child Advocacy Center and the creation of "S.O.S.," a tutoring program for Cepheids that aims to increase the club's academic status on campus. Cepheid advisor James "Spanky" Smith won an award for being the advisor of the year during the same ceremony.

Current data 
AggieCon 52 will be held on March 3-5, 2023.
AggieCon 51 was held at Rudder Tower, located on the Texas A&M University campus, from March 25-27, 2022.

Past conventions 
(GoH: Guest of Honor)
 Science Fiction Week (retroactively AggieCon I) – April 21–24, 1969; GoH: Harlan Ellison
 Cepheid Comics and Trade Convention (retroactively AggieCon II) – Spring 1970; no GoH
 AggieCon III – April 7–9, 1972; The first convention to officially use the name AggieCon, no GoH
 AggieCon IV – March 2–4, 1973; GoH: Jack Williamson, Chad Oliver, Robert E. Vardeman, Joe Pumilia
 AggieCon V – April 12–14, 1974; GoH: Harlan Ellison, Keith Laumer, Howard Waldrop
 AggieCon VI – March 28–30, 1975; Larry Niven, Fan GoH: "Fuzzy Pink" Niven
 AggieCon VII – March 26–28, 1976; Anne McCaffrey
 AggieCon VIII – March 24–27, 1977; Fred Pohl
 AggieCon IX – March 30 – April 2, 1978; GoH: Damon Knight, Wilson "Bob" Tucker, Alan Dean Foster, Geo. W. Proctor, Bob Vardeman
 AggieCon X – March 29 – April 1, 1979; GoH: Theodore Sturgeon, Boris Vallejo, Wilson "Bob" Tucker
 AggieCon XI – March 27–30, 1980; GoH: Poul Anderson, Jack Williamson, Katherine Kurtz, Frank Kelly Freas
 AggieCon XII – March 26–29, 1981; GoH: Joe Haldeman, Alicia Austin, C. J. Cherryh
 AggieCon XIII – March 25–28, 1982; GoH: Roger Zelazny, Artist GoH: Vincent Di Fate, Special GoH: Fred Saberhagen
 AggieCon XIV – March 24–27, 1983; GoH: Harry Harrison, Michael Whelan, Stephen R. Donaldson, Chad Oliver
 AggieCon XV – March 29 – April 1, 1984; GoH: L. Sprague de Camp, Catherine Crook de Camp, Don Maitz, Wilson "Bob" Tucker, James P. Hogan
 AggieCon XVI – March 21–24, 1985; GoH: John Varley, James Christensen, Ed Bryant, Patricia McKillip
 AggieCon XVII – April 3–6, 1986; GoH: George R. R. Martin, Frank Kelly Freas, Orson Scott Card, Howard Waldrop, Kerry O'Quinn.  Convention Chairman was Martha Wells
 AggieCon XVIII – April 2–5, 1987; GoH: Ben Bova, Christopher Stasheff, Rowena Morrill, Steve Gould, Kerry O'Quinn
 AggieCon XIX – March 24–27, 1988; Joe Haldeman, Katherine Kurtz, Bob Eggleton, Kerry O'Quinn
 AggieCon XX – March 30 - April 2, 1989; GoH: George R.R. Martin, Octavia Butler
 AggieCon XXI – March 29 – April 1, 1990; GoH: Walter Koenig, Spider Robinson, Jeanne Robinson, Richard Pini
 AggieCon XXII – March 21–24, 1991; GoH:  Fred Saberhagen, Keith Parkinson, Larry Elmore, Marv Wolfman, Elizabeth Ann Scarborough
 AggieCon XXIII – March 26–29, 1992; GoH: David Drake, Barbara Hambly, Julius Schwartz, Real Musgrave, Kerry O'Quinn
 AggieCon XXIV – March 25–28, 1993; GoH: Peter David, Michael Moorcock, Wendy Pini, Charles N. Brown
 AggieCon XXV – March 24–27, 1994; GoH: Greg Bear, Lois McMaster Bujold, Charles de Lint, Julius Schwartz, Frank Kelly Freas, Laura Brodian Kelly-Freas
 AggieCon XXVI – March 23–26, 1995; GoH: Jim Baen, John Byrne
 AggieCon XXVII – March 21–24, 1996; GoH: Bernie Wrightson, Nancy Collins, Joe Christ, Dave Wolverton, Kerry O'Quinn, Richard Biggs, Kevin J. Anderson, Rebecca Moesta, Gwar
 AggieCon XXVIII – March 20–23, 1997; GoH:  Brian Stelfreeze
 AggieCon XXIX – March 26–29, 1998; GoH: Robert Asprin, Joe R. Lansdale, Tad Williams, Phil & Kaja Foglio, Garth Ennis, John McCrea
 AggieCon XXX – March 25–28, 1999; GoH: Bruce Sterling, Larry Elmore, Nigel Bennett, Ted Raimi
 AggieCon XXXI – March 23–26, 2000; GoH: Harlan Ellison, Terry Pratchett, Tim Bradstreet
 AggieCon XXXII – March 22–25, 2001; GoH: Charles de Lint, Melanie Rawn, Martha Wells, Julie Caitlin Brown. Convention director was Yaru Liu.
 AggieCon XXXIII – March 21–24, 2002; GoH was Neil Gaiman, Artist GoH was Charles Keegan, and other notable guests included Joe R. Lansdale, John Lucas, Brian Stelfreeze, and Karen Lansdale. Convention director was Yaru Liu.
 AggieCon XXXIV – March 20–23, 2003; GoH: Virginia Hey, Lani Tupu, Ruth Thompson, Peter David
 AggieCon XXXV – March 25–28, 2004; GoH: Jacqueline Carey, Todd McCaffrey
 AggieCon XXXVI – April 21–24, 2005; GoH: Michael Moorcock, Elizabeth Moon, Red vs. Blue
 AggieCon XXXVII – March 23–26, 2006; GoH: Steven Brust, James Charles Leary, Peter Mayhew, Brian Stelfreeze
 AggieCon XXXVIII – March 22–25, 2007; GoH: Gene Wolfe (Wolfe cancelled at the last minute and did not attend), James O'Barr, Richard Hatch, Ruth Thompson
 AggieCon XXXIX – March 27–30, 2008; GoH: Ellen Muth
 AggieCon XL – March 26–29, 2009; GoH: Todd McCaffrey,　Kristen Perry, Jennifer Rhodes
 AggieCon XLI (held at the College Station Hilton Hotel) – February 5–7, 2010; GoH: Steven Gould,　AGoH: David Lee Anderson, SG: Martha Wells, Editor GoH: Ellen Datlow, Toastmaster: Selina Rosen, Media GoH: Marv Wolfman, SG: Noel Wolfman
 AggieCon XLII (held at the College Station Hilton Hotel) – 2011
 AggieCon XLIII (held at the College Station Hilton Hotel) – March 23–25, 2012
 AggieCon XLIV (held at the College Station Hilton Hotel) – March 22–24, 2013; GOH: George R. R. Martin, Ernest Cline, Sam De La Rosa, Dante Shepherd, Barbara Ann Wright, Erin Ewer, Holden Shearer, David Liss, Keri Bean, and Area of Defect
 AggieCon XLV (Held at the College Station Hilton Hotel) - April 4–6, 2014 GOH: Jeffrey Cranor, Aaron Dismuke, Airship Nikolai, Ed Wetterman, and Marc Gunn.
 AggieCon XLVI (Held at the College Station Hilton Hotel) - March 27–29, 2015 GOH: Mark Stefanowicz, Ed Wetterman, Lewis "Linkara" Lovhaug, Kathryn Friesen, Kimberley Hix Trant.
 AggieCon XLVII (Held at the Brazos Valley Expo Center) - April 1-3, 2016
 AggieCon XLVIII (Held at the Brazos Valley Expo Center) - March 24-26, 2017
 AggieCon LI (Held at Rudder Tower on the Texas A&M campus) - March 25-27, 2022 Guests: Aaron Dismuke, John Swasey

References

External links 
AggieCon official website
Cepheid Variable Wiki ("Cepheidopedia") – Wiki of the group that puts on AggieCon.  Here you can find information about old AggieCons and the program book covers.
Texas A&M University Cushing Memorial Library and Archives AggieCon-related recordings and other items stored in the Science Fiction and Fantasy Research Collection.

Science fiction conventions in the United States
Texas A&M University student organizations
Conventions in Texas
1969 establishments in Texas
Recurring events established in 1969